Compact (stylized COMPACT, published with the subtitle "Magazine for Sovereignty" since October 2013) is a German magazine. The editorial office is based in a family home in Falkensee in Brandenburg, at the western border of Berlin.

The Federal Office for the Protection of the Constitution (German: Bundesamt für Verfassungsschutz) categorizes the journal as a far-right extremist publication due to consistent Antisemitism, Islamophobia and contempt for the democratic principles of the Federal Republic of Germany. Since 2015, Compact has presented itself as a mouthpiece of the far-right party Alternative for Germany (AfD) and the Islamophobic Pegida movement. In December 2021 Compact was designated as a proven far-right extremist publication by the Federal Office for the Protection of the Constitution.

History and business
In 2008, the editorial  began publishing a book series called Compact, which was edited by Elsässer. In December 2010, the "zeroth" (Nullnummer) issue of the Compact magazine was published.

The magazine's domain was temporarily seized by a German court in January 2018 after Compact failed to pay litigation fees. The journalist Richard Gutjahr had obtained a preliminary injunction against the vile suspicions about him that had been spread via Compact. The magazine suggested that the journalist had known about terrorist attacks in advance.

Since mid-2013, Compact magazine has advertised under the motto "Courage to the Truth", which the AfD has also used as a slogan. Elsässer distributed the magazine initially on AfD political conventions. In spring of 2015, he decided to make the magazine an election campaign for the AfD. Especially since the 2015 migrant crisis in Europe, Compact advertises regularly with front pages and theme books for AfD politicians and their positions. Three days before the regional election in Saxony-Anhalt in 2016, Elsässer hosted a live conference with leading AfD candidate André Poggenburg, giving him space to present the AfD goals. He presented Compact as the voice of the "silent majority" and the AfD as their party. On election night Poggenburg did not answer questions from the public broadcasters, but instead only spoke to Compact. Thus Compact has positioned itself as the mouthpiece of the kind of AfD and Pegida supporters who completely reject the mainstream media, calling it the "lying press".

Impact and reception
The media journalist Benjamin Friedrich wrote in 2016: "The journalistic performance of the magazine is low. Elsässer paraphrases or copies articles from the "mainstream press" and at the end adds to them the toughest possible opinion." According to Friedrich, Elsässer has copied and rephrased passages from the renowned Frankfurter Allgemeine Zeitung without attribution. He wrote that the right-wing scene in Germany could probably give more readers to Compact and Junge Freiheit, but he assumed that right-wing sympathizers mistrust printed newspapers in general and tend to use more online media.

Compact is described as „Querfront-Magazin“ („Querfront“ literally meaning "cross-front", a term whose use in modern times mostly describes attempts at forming an alliance of left- and right-wing groups against globalism and in favour of populism).

These traditionally left-wing positions are employed by Compact to reach pro-Russian and nationalistic conclusions.

Andre Haller showed in a study from 2018, based on empiric observations undertaken in the U.S. and Germany, that populist politicians and right-wing alternative media are drawing ever closer to each other and that mutual dependencies are arising. He identified Compact as one of the main right-wing media outlets in Germany.

In 2016, the magazine won a negative prize  ("Golden Tin Foil Hat") in the category "media and blogs" for its receptivity towards conspiracy theories.

In August 2020, the magazine's Facebook and Instagram accounts were banned. Facebook said: "[We] prohibit organizations and individuals from using our services if they systematically attack people based on characteristics such as origin, gender and nationality. Therefore, we have removed Compact magazine from Facebook and Instagram." 

In December 2021, the magazine was designated as a proven far-right extremist publication by the Federal Office for the Protection of the Constitution.

Citations

External links
 Official website (in German)

2010 establishments in Germany
Alternative for Germany
Anti-immigration politics in Germany
Anti-Islam sentiment in Germany
Conspiracist media
Far-right politics in Germany
German-language magazines
German news websites
Islamophobic publications
Magazines established in 2010
Mass media in Brandenburg
Neo-Nazi publications
New Right (Europe)
Political magazines published in Germany
Right-wing populism in Germany
Media of Neue Rechte
Anti-American sentiment in Germany